Pereira & Luckman was a Los Angeles, California architectural firm that partners Charles Luckman and William Pereira founded in Los Angeles in 1950. They had been classmates at the University of Illinois’ School of Architecture and had each become prominent thereafter, Pereira designing cinemas around the U.S. and a film studio for Paramount Pictures. The partnership eventually employed more than 300 architects.

The firm is notable for having designed such landmarks in the Los Angeles area as the Theme Building at Los Angeles International Airport, CBS Television City and several J. W. Robinson's department stores, but also work for NASA, Hilton Hotels and many others. It employed Paul Williams.

Works
Source:
1951
 Farmers & Stockmen's Bank, Phoenix, Arizona
 Gibraltar Savings & Loan Headquarters, Beverly Hills, California
 Robinson's department store, Beverly Hills (demolished)
 Robinson's department store, Pasadena, California
 1952
 Avco Research Center, Wilmington, Massachusetts
 Beverly Hills Hotel Addition, Beverly Hills
 Doheny Office Building, Beverly Hills
 Hilton Hotels headquarters, Beverly Hills
 Lear Industrial plant, Santa Monica
 Luke Air Force Base, Phoenix, Arizona
 1953
 CBS Television City, Los Angeles
 Western Hydraulics plant, Van Nuys, California
 1954
 Electronics and Radio Propagation Research Laboratories, Camp Pendleton, Oceanside, California
 KEYT Television Station, Santa Barbara, California
 KTTV Television Station, Los Angeles
 National Bureau of Standards building, Boulder, Colorado
 Santa Rosa Hall - Dormitory, University of California, Santa Barbara
 Seagram Building, New York City (early designs)
 United States Navy training facility, San Diego, California
 Wadsworth General Hospital, Veteran's Administration, Los Angeles
 Western Hydraulics Plant 2, Van Nuys, California
 William H. Block Department Store, Indianapolis
 WSBT Television Station, South Bend, Indiana
 Marineland of the Pacific, Rancho Palos Verdes, California
 1955
 Dormitories, Music and Science Buildings, Occidental College, Los Angeles
 Jet Production and Test Center, Palmdale, California
 Service Bureau Office Building, Los Angeles
 Whittier Downs Shopping Center (demolished), Santa Fe Springs, California
 1956
 Fallbrook Hospital, Fallbrook, California
 General Telephone Company Administration Building, Whittier, California
 Hunter Engineering plant, Riverside, California
 Prudential Tower, Boston (early designs)
 Southern California School of Theology, Claremont, California (now Claremont School of Theology)
 United States Air Force and Naval Bases, Cádiz, Spain
 Braniff International Airways, Operations and Maintenance Base, Dallas, Texas
 1957
 First National Bank, Denver, Colorado
 Motion Picture Country House and Hospital, Woodland Hills, California
 Nellis Air Force Base buildings, Nevada
 1958
 Beckman Corporation plant, Newport Beach, California
 Berlin Hilton, Berlin, Germany
 Bullock's Fashion Square, Santa Ana, California (demolished except for the Bullock's department store, which continues as part of the MainPlace Mall built in site in 1987)
 Chrysler Sales & Service Training Center, Anaheim, California
 Convair Astronautics, San Diego, California
 Disneyland Hotel (California) The original
 Firestone Tire company headquarters, Los Angeles
 Ford Aeronutronics, Newport Beach, California (demolished)
 General Atomic, La Jolla, California
 Grossmont Hospital, San Diego, California
 IBM headquarters, Los Angeles
 Los Angeles International Airport
 Physical Plant Building B, University of Southern California
 Robinson's department store, Palm Springs, California
 Signal Oil headquarters, Los Angeles
 Union Oil Center, Los Angeles (now Los Angeles Center Studios)
 Valley Presbyterian Hospital, Van Nuys, California
 1959
 Theme Building LAX (with Paul Williams and Welton Becket)

References

Defunct architecture firms based in California